This list of the Mesozoic life of Wyoming contains the various prehistoric life-forms whose fossilized remains have been reported from within the US state of Wyoming and are between 252.17 and 66 million years of age.

A

 †Abielites
 †Abielites angusticarpus
  Acipenser
 †Acipenser eruciferus
 †Acutostrea
 †Acutostrea plumosa
  †Adocus
  †Agathaumas – type locality for genus
 †Agathaumas sylvestris – type locality for species
  †Agerostrea
 †Agerostrea mesenterica
 †Agialopous – type locality for genus
 †Agialopous wyomingensis – type locality for species
  †Albanerpeton
 †Albanerpeton galaktion
 †Albanerpeton nexuosus – type locality for species
  †Albertosaurus – or unidentified comparable form
 †Alethesaurus – type locality for genus
 †Alethesaurus quadratus – type locality for species
 †Aletridelphys
 †Aletridelphys florencae – type locality for species
 †Aletridelphys hatcheri
 †Allacodon
 †Allacodon lentus – type locality for species
 †Allacodon pumilis – type locality for species
   †Allognathosuchus
  †Allosaurus – type locality for genus
 †Allosaurus fragilis – type locality for species
 †Allosaurus jimmadseni
 †Alostera
 †Alostera saskatchewanensis – type locality for species
  †Alphadon
 †Alphadon attaragos – type locality for species
 †Alphadon halleyi
 †Alphadon marshi
 †Alphadon sahnii
 †Altacreodus
 †Altacreodus magnus
 †Alzadites
 †Alzadites westonensis – type locality for species
 †Amblotherium – type locality for genus
 †Amblotherium gracilis – type locality for species
 †Amborellites – type locality for genus
 †Amborellites wyomingensis – type locality for species
  Amia
 †Amia fragosa
 †Amia uintaensis
 †Amphicoelias
 †Amphicoelias brontodiplodocus – type locality for species
 †Amphidon – type locality for genus
 †Amphidon superstes – type locality for species
 †Anaklinoceras
 †Anaklinoceras mortoni
 †Anaschisma – type locality for genus
 †Anaschisma brachygnatha – type locality for species
 †Anaschisma browni – type locality for species
 †Anceptophyllum – type locality for genus
 †Anceptophyllum pulcrum – type locality for species
 †Anchura – tentative report
 †Ancorichnus
 †Andromeda
 †Andromeda grayana
 †Anemia
 †Anemia fremonti
 †Anemia subcretacea
   †Angistorhinus – type locality for genus
 †Angistorhinus aeolamnis – type locality for species
 †Angistorhinus gracilis – type locality for species
 †Angistorhinus grandis – type locality for species
 †Angistorhinus maximus – type locality for species
 †Anisoceras
 †Anisomyon
 †Anisomyon borealis
 †Anisomyon centrale
 †Anisomyon patelliformis
 †Anisomyon subovatus – or unidentified related form
 †Anisomyon subovulatus
 †Ankistrorhynchus
 †Ankistrorhynchus washakiensis – type locality for species
  †Ankylosaurus
 †Ankylosaurus magniventris
 †Anomalofusus – tentative report
 Anomia
 †Anomia tellinoides
 Anona
 †Anona robusta – tentative report
 †Anthrotaxopsis
 †Anthrotaxopsis tenuicaulis
  Antrimpos
 †Apatodonosaurus
 †Apatodonosaurus grayi
 †Apatosaurinae
 †Apatosaurinae – type locality for genus – informal
  †Apatosaurus
 †Apatosaurus louisae
 †Apatosaurus minimus
 †Apeibopsis – tentative report
 †Apeibopsis discolor
 †Aploconodon – type locality for genus
 †Aploconodon comoensis – type locality for species
  Aporrhais
 †Aporrhais biangulata
 †Aquilina – type locality for genus
 †Aquilina grossidentata – type locality for species
 Aralia
 †Aralia veatchii
 †Araliaephyllum
 †Araliaephyllum artocarpoides
   Araucaria
 †Araucarites
 †Araucarites cuneatus – type locality for species
 †Araucarites longifolia
 †Araucarites wyomingensis – type locality for species
 Arca – report made of unidentified related form or using admittedly obsolete nomenclature
 †Arcellites
 †Arcellites disciformis
 †Archaeotriakis
 †Archaeotriakis ornatus – type locality for species
 †Archaeotriakis rochelleae
 †Archaeotrigon – type locality for genus
 †Archaeotrigon brevimaxillus – type locality for species
  †Arcticoceras
 †Arenicolites
 †Aristolochites
 †Aristolochites brittoni
 †Ascarinites – type locality for genus
 †Ascarinites communis – type locality for species
 Aspideretes
 †Aspideretoides
 †Aspideretoides foveatus – or unidentified comparable form
 †Asplenites
 †Asplenites tenellum
  †Asplenium
 †Asplenium haguei
 †Asplenium neomexicanum
 †Asplenium occidentale
 †Astandes
 †Astandes densatus
 †Astarta
 †Astarta packardi
 Astarte
 †Astarte gregaria
 †Astarte livingstonensis
 †Astarte meeki
 †Astarte morion
 †Athrotaxopsis
 †Athrotaxopsis tenuicaulis
 † Atira – tentative report
 †Atira nebrascensis
 †Atokatheridium – or unidentified comparable form
  †Aublysodon
 †Aublysodon mirandus
 †Austrotindaria
 †Austrotindaria antiqua
 †Austrotindaria canalensis
 †Austrotindaria svalbardensis
 †Avernalia – type locality for genus
 †Avernalia solida – type locality for species

B

  †Baculites
 †Baculites asper
 †Baculites asperiformis
 †Baculites baculus
 †Baculites clinolobatus
 †Baculites cobbani
 †Baculites codyensis
 †Baculites crickmayi
 †Baculites elaisi
 †Baculites eliasi
 †Baculites gilberti
 †Baculites grandis
 †Baculites gregoryensis
 †Baculites haresi
 †Baculites jenseni – or unidentified comparable form
 †Baculites mariasensis
 †Baculites mclearni
 †Baculites obtusus
 †Baculites perplexus
 †Baculites reesidei
 †Baculites rugosus
 †Baculites scotti
 †Baena
 †Baena hatcheri – type locality for species
 †Baena hayi – type locality for species
 †Baena marshi – type locality for species
 †Baieropsis
 †Baieropsis adiantifolia
 †Baieropsis pluripartita
  †Baptanodon
 †Baptanodon discus
 †Baptanodon reedi – type locality for species
 †Baptanodon robustus – type locality for species
  Barbatia – tentative report
  †Barosaurus
 †Barosaurus lentus
  †Basilemys
 †Basilemys sinuosa
 †Batodon
 †Batodon tenuis – type locality for species
  †Belonostomus
 †Belonostomus longirostris
 Berenicea
 Bombur
  †Borealosuchus
 †Borealosuchus sternbergii – type locality for species
 †Boremys
 †Borissiakoceras
 †Borissiakoceras orbiculatum
 Botula
 †Botula ripleyana
  Brachaelurus
 †Brachaelurus bighornensis – type locality for species
  †Brachiosaurus
 †Brachybrachium – type locality for genus
 †Brachybrachium brevipes – type locality for species
  †Brachychampsa
 †Brachychampsa montana
 †Brachyphyllum
 †Brachyphyllum crassum
 †Brontopodus – or unidentified comparable form
 †Brontopodus birdi
  †Brontosaurus – type locality for genus
 †Brontosaurus excelsus – type locality for species
 †Brontosaurus parvus – type locality for species
 †Brontosaurus yahnahpin – type locality for species
 †Bryceomys
 †Bullopsis
 †Bullopsis cretacea – or unidentified related form

C

  †Cadoceras
 Callista
 †Callista deweyi
 †Callista peplucida
  †Calycoceras
 †Calycoceras canitaurinum
  †Camarasaurus – type locality for genus
 †Camarasaurus grandis – type locality for species
 †Camarasaurus lentus – type locality for species
 †Camborygma
  Campeloma
 †Camptomus
 †Camptomus amplus – type locality for species
 †Camptonectes
 †Camptonectes bellistriatus
 †Camptonectes distans – or unidentified comparable form
 †Camptonectes platessiformis
 †Camptonectes stygius
  †Camptosaurus
 †Camptosaurus dispar – type locality for species
 † Canna
 †Canna magnifolia – tentative report
 †Capillirhynchia
 †Capillirhynchia gallatinensis – type locality for species
 Cardium sp.
 †Carpites
 †Carpites lancensis
 †Carpites verrucosus
 †Carpites walcotti
 †Carpolithus
 †Carpolithus barrensis – type locality for species
 †Carpolithus fasciculatus
 †Carpolithus foenarius – type locality for species
 †Carpolithus montiumnigrorum – type locality for species
 †Carpolithus virginiensis
 †Carthaginites
 †Carthaginites aquilonius – type locality for species
 †Cataceramus
 †Cataceramus tenuilineatus
 †Cedrobaena
 †Cedrobaena brinkman
 †Celastrophyllum
 †Celastrophyllum gyminaefolium
  †Celastrus – tentative report
 †Celastrus taurinensis
 †Cemeterius – type locality for genus
 †Cemeterius monstrosus – type locality for species
 †Centrophoroides
 †Centrophoroides worlandensis – type locality for species
 †Cephalotaxopsis
 †Cephalotaxopsis magnifolia
 †Ceramornis – type locality for genus
 †Ceramornis major – type locality for species
  †Ceratodus
 †Ceratodus frazieri
 †Ceratodus guentheri
  †Ceratosaurus
 Cercidiphyllum
 †Cercidiphyllum arcticum
 †Cercidiphyllum ellipticum
 †Cercomya
 †Cercomya punctata
 †Ceritella
  Cerithium – tentative report
 †Chamops – type locality for genus
 †Chamops segnis – type locality for species
   †Champsosaurus
 †Champsosaurus natator
 †Chelonipus – or unidentified comparable form
  Chiloscyllium
 †Chiloscyllium missouriense
  †Chirotherium
 †Chirotherium barthii
 Chlamys
 †Chlamys nebrascensis
 †Chondroceras
  †Cimexomys
 †Cimexomys minor
 †Cimolestes
 †Cimolestes incisus – type locality for species
 †Cimolestes stirtoni – type locality for species
 †Cimolodon
 †Cimolodon nitidus – type locality for species
 †Cimolodon peregrinus – type locality for species
  †Cimolomys
 †Cimolomys clarki
 †Cimolomys gracilis – type locality for species
 †Cimolomys parvus – type locality for species
  †Cimolopteryx
 †Cimolopteryx maxima – type locality for species
 †Cimolopteryx rara
 Cinnamomum
 †Cinnamomum hesperium
 †Cissitis
 †Cissitis rocklandensis
 Cissus
 †Cissus lobato-crenata – tentative report
 †Cladoceramus
 †Cladoceramus undulatoplicatus – or unidentified related form
  Cladophlebis
 †Cladophlebis parva
 †Cladophlebis readi – type locality for species
 †Cladophlebis readii
 †Cladophlebis wyomingensis – type locality for species
 †Claraia
 †Claraia clarai
 †Claraia mulleri
 †Claraia stachei
 †Clemensodon – type locality for genus
 †Clemensodon megaloba – type locality for species
 †Clioscaphites
 †Clioscaphites saxitonianus
 †Clioscaphites vermiformis
 †Coahuilites
 †Coahuilites sheltoni
 †Coelostylina
 †Coelosuchus – type locality for genus
 †Coelosuchus reedii – type locality for species
   †Coelurus – type locality for genus
 †Coelurus fragilis – type locality for species
  †Collignoniceras
 †Collignoniceras woollgari
 †Colpodontosaurus – type locality for genus
 †Colpodontosaurus cracens – type locality for species
 †Comobatrachus – type locality for genus
 †Comobatrachus aenigmaticus – type locality for species
 †Comodactylus – type locality for genus
 †Comodactylus ostromi – type locality for species
 †Comodon – type locality for genus
 †Comodon gidleyi – type locality for species
 †Comonecturoides – type locality for genus
 †Comonecturoides marshi – type locality for species
 †Comotherium – type locality for genus
 †Comotherium richi – type locality for species
 †Compsemys
 †Compsemys victa
 †Confusionella
 †Confusionella loczyi – type locality for species
  †Coniophis – type locality for genus
 †Coniophis precedens – type locality for species
 †Coniopteris – tentative report
 †Contogenys – or unidentified comparable form
 †Corax
 †Corbicella – tentative report
  Corbula
 †Corbula crassimarginata
 †Corbula kanabensis
 †Corbula munda
 †Coriops
 †Coriops amnicolus
 †Cornophyllum
 †Cornophyllum wardii
  †Corosaurus
 †Corosaurus alcovensis
 Cossmannea
 Crassatella
 †Crassatella evansi
 †Crassidenticulum
 †Crassidenticulum aquilae – type locality for species
 †Crassidenticulum decurrens
 Crenella
 †Cretorectolobus
 †Cretorectolobus olsoni
 †Cryptometoicoceras – type locality for genus
 †Cryptometoicoceras mite – type locality for species
 †Cryptorhytis
 †Cryptorhytis cheyennensis
 †Ctenacodon – type locality for genus
 †Ctenacodon laticeps – type locality for species
 †Ctenacodon scindens – type locality for species
 †Ctenacodon serratus – type locality for species
 †Cteniogenys – type locality for genus
 †Cteniogenys antiquus – type locality for species
 †Ctenostreon
 †Ctenostreon gikshanensis – or unidentified comparable form
  Cucullaea
 †Cucullaea haguei
 †Cucullaea shumardi
 †Cunningtoniceras
 Cuspidaria
 †Cuspidaria variablis
 †Cycadeospermum
 †Cycadeospermum rotundatum
 †Cyclurus
 †Cyclurus fragosus
 †Cylindricum
 †Cymbophora
 †Cymbophora canonensis – or unidentified comparable form
 †Cymbophora formosa
 †Cymbophora holmesi
 †Cyperacites
 †Czekanowskia
 †Czekanowskia nervosa

D

 †Dakotasaurus – type locality for genus
 †Dakotasaurus browni – type locality for species
  †Daspletosaurus
  †Deinonychus
 †Deinonychus antirrhopus
 †Delphodon
 †Delphodon comptus – type locality for species
 †Deltatheroides – or unidentified comparable form
 †Dennstaedtia
 †Dennstaedtia fremonti
 Dentalium
 †Dentalium gracile
 †Dentalium pauperculum
 †Derrisemys
 †Derrisemys sterea
  †Desmatosuchus
 †Desmoscaphites
 †Desmoscaphites bassleri
 †Dewalquea
 †Dewalquea pulchella
 †Diastopora
 †Diastopora cutleri – type locality for species
 †Dicellonema
 †Dicellonema abrekensis
 †Dicotyledon
  †Didelphodon
 †Didelphodon vorax – type locality for species
  †Didymoceras
 †Didymoceras nebrascense
 †Didymoceras stevensoni
 †Dillenites
 †Dillenites cleburni
 †Dinochelys
 †Dinochelys whitei
 †Diospyros
 †Diospyros stenosepala
 †Diploconcha
  †Diplocraterion
 †Diplodocinae
 †Diplodocinae – type locality for genus – informal
  †Diplodocus
 †Diplodocus carnegii – type locality for species
 †Diplodocus hallorum
 †Diplodocus longus
  †Discoscaphites
 †Docodon – type locality for genus
 †Docodon affinis – type locality for species
 †Docodon crassus – type locality for species
 †Docodon striatus – type locality for species
 †Docodon superus – type locality for species
 †Docodon victor – type locality for species
 †Dolichobrachium – type locality for genus
 †Dolichobrachium gracile – type locality for species
  †Dolichorhynchops
 †Dolichorhynchops bonneri – type locality for species
 †Dolichorhynchops osborni
 †Dombeyopsis
 †Dombeyopsis colgatensis
 †Dombeyopsis obtusa
 †Dombeyopsis platanoides
 †Dombeyopsis trivialis
 †Doratodon – tentative report
 †Dorsetisaurus
 †Dosiniopsis
 †Dosiniopsis deweyi
 †Drepanocheilus
 †Drepanocheilus evansi
 †Drepanocheilus nebrascensis
 †Drepanocheilus obesus
 †Drepanocheilus scotti – or unidentified comparable form
 †Drinker – type locality for genus
 †Drinker nisti – type locality for species
  †Dromaeosaurus
 †Dryandroides
 †Dryandroides lanceolata
 †Dryolestes – type locality for genus
 †Dryolestes priscus – type locality for species
 †Dryolestes vorax
 †Dryophyllum – type locality for genus
 †Dryophyllum lanceolatum
 †Dryophyllum polymorphum – type locality for species
 †Dryophyllum subfalcatum
 Dryopteris
 †Dryopteris coloradensis
 †Dryosaurus
 †Dryosaurus altus – type locality for species
 †Dryptosaurus – or unidentified comparable form
 †Dunveganoceras
 †Dunveganoceras pondi
 †Dunveganoceras problematicum
 †Dyslocosaurus – type locality for genus
 †Dyslocosaurus polyonychius – type locality for species

E

 †Echidnocephalus – tentative report
  †Edmontonia
 †Edmontonia rugosidens – or unidentified comparable form
 †Edmontosaurus
  †Edmontosaurus annectens – type locality for species
 †Egertonodus
  †Elaphrosaurus – tentative report
  †Elasmosaurus
 †Elatides
 †Ellipsoscapha
 †Ellipsoscapha occidentalis
 †Emarginachelys
 †Empo
 †Enneabatrachus – type locality for genus
 †Enneabatrachus hechti – type locality for species
 Entalis
 †Entalis paupercula – tentative report
 †Entalophora
 †Entalophora stokesi – type locality for species
 †Eobatrachus – type locality for genus
 †Eobatrachus agilis – type locality for species
 †Eocephalites
 †Eocephalites primus
 †Eokainaster – type locality for genus
 †Eokainaster pewei
  †Eopelobates
 †Equisetites
  †Equisetum
 †Equisetum FF014 – informal
 †Equisetum RS016 – informal
 †Equisetum virginicum
 †Essonodon
 †Essonodon browni
 †Estescincosaurus – type locality for genus
 †Estescincosaurus cooki – type locality for species
 †Eubaena – type locality for genus
 †Eubaena cephalica – type locality for species
  †Eubostrychoceras
 †Eubostrychoceras matsumotoi – type locality for species
 †Eubrachiosaurus – type locality for genus
 †Eubrachiosaurus browni – type locality for species
 †Eucalycoceras
 †Eucalycoceras templetonense
 †Eucrossorhinus
 †Eucrossorhinus microcuspidatus
 †Eumorphotis
 †Eumorphotis multiformis
 †Euomphaloceras
 †Euomphaloceras merewetheri
 †Eurysalenia
 †Eurysalenia minima
 †Euspira
 †Euspira obliquata
 †Euthlastus – type locality for genus
 †Euthlastus cordiformis – type locality for species
  †Eutrephoceras
 †Eutrephoceras montanaense
 †Eutretauranosuchus
 †Eutretauranosuchus delfsi
 †Exiteloceras
 †Exiteloceras jenneyi
 †Exogyra
 †Exogyra costata
 †Exostinus – type locality for genus
 †Exostinus lancensis – type locality for species

F

 †Falepetrus
 †Falepetrus barwini – type locality for species
  Fasciolaria
 †Fasciolaria flexicostata – tentative report
 †Feistmantelia – type locality for genus
 †Feistmantelia oblonga – type locality for species
 †Ficophyllum
 †Ficophyllum serratum
 Ficus
 †Ficus fremonti
 †Ficus Fremontii
 †Ficus inaequalis
 †Ficus paryearensis
 †Ficus planicosta
 †Ficus planicostata
 †Ficus rockvalensis
 †Ficus trinervis
 †Filicites
 †Filicites knowltoni
 †Forresteria
 †Forresteria stantoni
  †Fosterovenator – type locality for genus
 †Fosterovenator churei – type locality for species
 †Foxraptor – type locality for genus
 †Foxraptor atrox – type locality for species
 †Fraxinus
 †Fraxinus denticulata
 †Fraxinus leii

G

  †Galeamopus
 †Galeamopus hayi
 †Galeamopus pabsti – type locality for species
  †Gargoyleosaurus
 †Gargoyleosaurus parkpinorum
 †Geinitzia
 †Geinitzia Jenneyi – type locality for species
 †Geonomites
 †Geonomites schimperi
 Gerrhonotus – or unidentified comparable form
 †Gervillaria
 †Gervillaria montanaensis
 †Gervillia
 †Gervillia dolabrata
 †Gervillia ussurica – or unidentified comparable form
 †Gilmoremys
 †Gilmoremys lancensis – type locality for species
 Ginglymostoma
 †Ginglymostoma globidens
  Ginkgo
 †Ginkgo adiantoides – tentative report
 †Glasbius
 †Glasbius intricatus – type locality for species
 †Gleichenites
 †Gleichenites sepulta
  †Glyptops – type locality for genus
 †Glyptops pervicax
 †Glyptops plicatulus – type locality for species
  Glyptostrobus
 †Glyptostrobus brookensis
  †Gobiconodon
 †Gobiconodon ostromi
 †Goniomya
 †Goniomya montanaensis
  †Goniopholis
 †Gracilimanus
 †Gracilimanus obscurus
 †Grammatodon
 †Grammatodon haguei
 †Graphidula
 †Graphidula alleni – or unidentified comparable form
  †Graphidula culbertsoni
 †Grewiopsis
 †Grewiopsis saportana
 †Gryphaea
 †Gryphaea nebrascensis
 †Gryphaea planoconvexa
 †Gypsonictops
 †Gypsonictops hypoconus – type locality for species
 †Gypsonictops lewisi
 †Gypsonicus
 †Gypsonicus wyomingensis

H

 †Habrosaurus – type locality for genus
 †Habrosaurus dilatus – type locality for species
 †Hadrosauropodus
 †Halymenites
 †Halymenites major
 †Hamites
 †Hamites cimarronensis
 †Hamites novimexicanus
 †Hamites salebrosus
  †Haplocanthosaurus
 †Haptosphenus – type locality for genus
 †Haptosphenus placodon – type locality for species
 †Haresiceras
 †Haresiceras natronense
 †Harpactognathus – type locality for genus
 †Harpactognathus gentryii – type locality for species
 †Hatcheritherium – type locality for genus
 †Hatcheritherium alpha – type locality for species
 †Hausmannia
 †Hausmannia AF017
 †Helopanoplia
 †Helopanoplia distincta
 Hemiaster
 †Hemiaster humphreysanus
  †Heptasuchus – type locality for genus
 †Heptasuchus clarki – type locality for species
 †Herpetarius
 †Herpetarius humilis
 †Hesperornithoides – type locality for genus
 †Hesperornithoides miessleri – type locality for species
  †Hesperosaurus – type locality for genus
 †Hesperosaurus mjosi – type locality for species
 †Heteroceras
 †Heteroceras cochleatum – tentative report
 †Homomya
 †Homomya gallatinensis
   †Hoploscaphites
 †Hoploscaphites birkelundae – type locality for species
 †Hoploscaphites gilli
 †Hoploscaphites macer
 †Hoploscaphites nodosus
 †Hoploscaphites plenus
 †Hoploscaphites quadrangularis
 †Hummelichelys
 †Hummelichelys beecheri – type locality for species
   †Hybodus
 †Hybodus montanensis
 †Hybodus wyomingensis – type locality for species
  †Hyperodapedon
 †Hyperodapedon sanjuanensis – or unidentified comparable form
 †Hypotodus
 †Hypotodus grandis
 †Hypsodon – tentative report
 †Hypsodon radiatulus

I

  †Ichthyodectes
 †Icthyodectes – tentative report
 †Icthyodesctes – tentative report
 †Idiohamites
 †Idiohamites bispinosus
 †Iguanavus
 †Iguanavus teres – type locality for species
  †Inoceramus
 †Inoceramus agdjakendensis – or unidentified comparable form
 †Inoceramus americanus – type locality for species
 †Inoceramus anglicus
 †Inoceramus balchii
 †Inoceramus barabini
 †Inoceramus crispii
 †Inoceramus deformis
 †Inoceramus dimidius
 †Inoceramus erectus – or unidentified related form
 †Inoceramus fibrosus
 †Inoceramus fragilis – or unidentified related form
 †Inoceramus gibbosus
 †Inoceramus glacierensis
 †Inoceramus grandis
 †Inoceramus incurvus
 †Inoceramus lundbreckensis
 †Inoceramus perplexus
 †Inoceramus prefragilis
 †Inoceramus proximus – or unidentified related form
 †Inoceramus sagensis
 †Inoceramus subcircularis
 †Inoceramus subcompressus
 †Inoceramus sublaevis
 †Inoceramus tenuirostratus
 †Inoceramus tenuiumbonatus – or unidentified comparable form
 †Inoceramus turgidus – or unidentified related form
 †Inoceramus typicus
 †Inoceramus umbonatus
 †Inoceramus undabundus
 †Ischyrhiza
  †Ischyrhiza avonicola – type locality for species
  †Ischyrhiza basinensis – type locality for species
  †Ischyrhiza mira
  Isocrinus
 †Isocrinus knighti
 †Isocrinus wyomingensis
 †Isocyprina
 †Isocyprina cinnabarensis
   Isognomon
 †Isognomon perplana – or unidentified comparable form
   Isurus – tentative report

J

 †Janumys
 †Jeletzkytes
 †Jeletzkytes dorfi – type locality for species
 †Jensensispermum
 †Judithemys
 †Judithemys backmani

K

 †Kaatedocus – type locality for genus
 †Kaatedocus siberi – type locality for species
  †Koskinonodon – type locality for genus
 †Koskinonodon perfectus – type locality for species

L

 †Lamarqueavis
 †Lamarqueavis minima – type locality for species
 †Lamarqueavis petra – type locality for species
 †Lamiasaura – type locality for genus
 †Lamiasaura ferox – type locality for species
 †Lanceosaurus – type locality for genus
 †Lanceosaurus compressus – type locality for species
 †Lanceosaurus hatcheri – type locality for species
 †Laolestes – type locality for genus
 †Laolestes eminens – type locality for species
 †Laolestes goodrichi – type locality for species
 †Laolestes oweni – type locality for species
 †Laopteryx – type locality for genus
 †Laopteryx priscus – type locality for species
 †Laosaurus – type locality for genus
 †Laosaurus celer – type locality for species
 †Laurophyllum
 †Laurophyllum coloradensis
 †Laurophyllum meeki
 †Laurophyllum salicifolium
 †Laurophyllum wardiana
 Laurus
 †Laurus aspensis – type locality for species
   †Lepidotes – or unidentified related form
  Lepisosteus
 †Lepisosteus occidentalis
 †Leptalestes
 †Leptalestes cooki – type locality for species
 †Leptalestes krejcii
   †Leptoceratops
 †Leptoceratops gracilis
 †Leptochamops
 †Leptochamops denticulatus – type locality for species
 †Leptochamops thrinax
 †Leptochondria
 †Leptochondria occidanea
 †Leptostrobus
 †Leptostrobus alatus – type locality for species
 †Leptostrobus longifolia
 †Leptostrobus longifolius
 †Lesterwardia – type locality for genus
 †Lesterwardia palustris – type locality for species
 †Leucichthyops
 †Leucichthyops vagans
 †Leucicthyops
 †Leucicthyops vagans
 Lima
 †Lima occidentalis
 Lingula
 †Lingula nitida – or unidentified comparable form
 †Lingularia
 †Lingularia borealis
 †Lioplacodes – or unidentified comparable form
 †Liostrea
 †Liostrea strigilecula
 Liquidambar
 †Liquidambar fontanella – type locality for species
 †Lisserpeton
 †Lisserpeton bairdi
  †Lissodus
 †Lissodus griffisi – type locality for species
 †Litakis – type locality for genus
 †Litakis gilmorei – type locality for species
 †Lonchidion – type locality for genus
 †Lonchidion selachos – type locality for species
 †Lonchisaurus – type locality for genus
 †Lonchisaurus trichurus – type locality for species
 †Lonchodytes – type locality for genus
 †Lonchodytes estesi – type locality for species
 †Lonchodytes pterygius – type locality for species
 †Lophochelys
  Lucina
 †Lucina mattiformis – or unidentified comparable form
 †Lucina occidentalis
 †Lucina subundata
  Lunatia – tentative report
  Lygodium
 †Lygodium AF030 – informal
 †Lyosoma
 †Lyosoma powelli

M

   †Macelognathus – type locality for genus
 †Macelognathus vagans – type locality for species
  Mactra
 †Mactra emmonsi
 †Mactromya – tentative report
 †Magadiceramus
 †Magadiceramus soukupi
 †Magadiceramus subquadratus
 †Magnoliophyllum
 †Magnoliophyllum cordatum
 †Malapoenna
 †Malapoenna weediana – tentative report
 Malletia
 †Malletia stephensoni
 †Manihotites
 †Manihotites georgiana
 †Matonidium
 †Matonidium Althaausii
 †Matonidium Althausii
  †Mecochirus
  †Megalneusaurus
 †Megalneusaurus rex – type locality for species
 †Megasphaeroceras
 †Megasphaeroceras rotundum – or unidentified comparable form
 †Meleagrinella
 †Meleagrinella curta
 †Melvius
 †Melvius thomasi
  †Meniscoessus
 †Meniscoessus gracilis – type locality for species
 †Meniscoessus intermedius
 †Meniscoessus robustus – type locality for species
 †Meniscoessus seminoensis – type locality for species
 †Meniscognathus – type locality for genus
 †Meniscognathus altmani – type locality for species
 †Menispermites
 †Menispermites belli
 †Menispermites cockerelli
 †Menispermites knightii
  †Menuites
 †Menuites complexus
 †Mesembrioxylon
 †Mesodma
 †Mesodma formosa
 †Mesodma hensleighi
 †Mesodma primaeva
 †Mesodma thompsoni – type locality for species
 †Metaptychoceras
 †Metoicoceras
 †Metoicoceras geslinianum
 †Metoicoceras mosbyense – or unidentified comparable form
 †Metoicoceras praecox
 †Micrabacia
 †Micrabacia radiata
 †Microtaenia
 †Microtaenia paucifolia
 †Microtaenia variabilis
  †Microvenator
 †Microvenator celer
 †Minerisporites
 †Minerisporites pseudorichardsonii
 Modiolus
 †Modiolus meekii
 †Modiolus subimbricatus
 †Montania – type locality for genus
 †Montania glandulosa – type locality for species
 †Moremanoceras
 †Moremanoceras costatum
 †Moremanoceras scotti
 †Moriconia
 †Moriconia cyclotoxon
 †Morosaurus
 †Myalina
 †Myalina postcarbonica
 †Myledaphus
 †Myledaphus bipartitus
  †Myophorella
 †Myophorella yellowstonensis
 Myrica
 †Myrica bolanderi – tentative report
 †Myrica nervosa
 †Myrtophyllum
 †Myrtophyllum torreyi
 †Mytiloides
 †Mytiloides stantoni
  †Mytilus
 †Mytilus whitei

N

 †Nageiopsis
 †Nageiopsis angustifolia
 †Nageiopsis longifolia
 †Nanocuris
 †Nanocuris improvida
 †Nanomyops
  †Nanosaurus
 †Nanosaurus rex
  †Nanotyrannus – tentative report
 †Naomichelys
 †Naomichelys speciosa
  †Nelumbo
 †Nelumbo weymouthi – type locality for species
 †Nelumbo weymouthii
 †Nemocardium
 †Nemocardium parahillanum
 †Nemodon
 †Nemodon eufalensis
 †Nemodon grandis
 †Neocardioceras
 †Neocardioceras laevigatum – type locality for species
 †Neocardioceras minutum – type locality for species
 †Neocardioceras transiens
 †Neocardioceras uptonense – type locality for species
 †Neogastroplites
 †Neogastroplites wyomingensis
 †Neonereites – or unidentified comparable form
 †Neonereites biserialis
 †Neoplagiaulax
 †Neoschizodus
 †Neoschizodus laevigatus
  †Nerinea – tentative report
 †Neurankylus
 †Neurankylus wyomingensis – type locality for species
 †Nilsonia
 †Nilsonia mehli
 †Nilsonia nigricollensis
 Nodosaria
  †Nodosaurus – type locality for genus
 †Nodosaurus textilis – type locality for species
 †Nonactaeonina
 †Nonactaeonina attenuata
  †Normannites – tentative report
 †Normannites crickmayi – or unidentified comparable form
 †Nortedelphys
 †Nortedelphys jasoni
 †Nortedelphys magnus
 †Nortedelphys minimus
  Nucula
 †Nucula cancellata
 †Nucula nacatochana
 †Nucula planimarginata
 Nuculana
 †Nuculana bisulcata
 †Nuculana corsicana
 †Nuculana equilateralis – tentative report
 †Nuculana evansi
 †Nuculana pittensis
 †Nymphaeites
 †Nymphaeites dawsoni

O

 †Obamadon
 †Obamadon gracilis
 †Obnixia – type locality for genus
 †Obnixia thaynesiana
 †Odaxosaurus – type locality for genus
 †Odaxosaurus piger – type locality for species
  Odontaspis
 †Odontaspis cheathami – type locality for species
 †Odontaspis steineri – type locality for species
 †Oklatheridium
 †Oklatheridium wiblei
 †Oligoptycha
 †Oligoptycha concinna
 †Omasaria
 †Onoclea
 †Onoclea minima
 †Opertochasma
  †Ophiopsis
 †Ophthalmosaurus
 †Ophthalmosaurus natans
 †Opisthias
 †Opisthias rarus – type locality for species
 †Opisthotriton
 †Opisthotriton kayi
  †Ornitholestes – type locality for genus
 †Ornitholestes hermanni – type locality for species
 †Ornithomimus
 †Ornithomimus minutus
 †Ornithomimus sedens – type locality for species
 †Ornithomimus velox – or unidentified comparable form
 †Orthotrigonia
 †Orthotrigonia sohli – tentative report
 †Osmakasaurus – tentative report
 †Osmakasaurus depressus
   Ostrea
 †Ostrea inornata
 †Othnielia
  †Othnielosaurus
 †Othnielosaurus consors – type locality for species
 †Oxybeloceras
 †Oxybeloceras crassum
 †Oxytoma
 †Oxytoma nebrascana

P

  †Pachycephalosaurus
 †Pachycephalosaurus wyomingensis – type locality for species
  †Pachyrhizodus
 †Pachyteuthis
 †Pachyteuthis densus
 †Palaeoaster
 †Palaeoaster inquirenda
  †Palaeobatrachus
 †Palaeobatrachus occidentalis – type locality for species
 †Palaeocypraea
 †Palaeocypraea squyeri – type locality for species
 †Palaeosaniwa – type locality for genus
 †Palaeosaniwa canadensis – type locality for species
 †Paleoaster
 †Paleoaster inquirenda
 †Paleopsephurus
 †Paleopsephurus wilsoni
 †Paleorhinus
 †Paleorhinus parvus – type locality for species
 †Paliurus
 †Paliurus minimus
 †Paliurus zizyphoides – tentative report
 †Pantosaurus – type locality for genus
 †Pantosaurus striatus – type locality for species
 †Parachondroceras
 †Parachondroceras andrewsi
 †Parachondroceras filicostatum
 †Paracimexomys
 †Paracimexomys priscus
 †Paracredneria
 †Paracredneria cretacea – type locality for species
 †Paraderma – type locality for genus
 †Paraderma bogerti – type locality for species
 †Paradiscoglossus – type locality for genus
 †Paradiscoglossus americanus – type locality for species
 †Paralbula
 †Paralbula casei
 †Paramacellodus
 †Paramacellodus keebleri
 †Paranymphaea
 †Paranymphaea hastata
 †Parasaniwa – type locality for genus
 †Parasaniwa wyomingensis – type locality for species
 †Parastomechinus
 †Parastomechinus brightoni
  †Parasuchus
 †Parasuchus bransoni – type locality for species
 †Paressonodon
 †Paressonodon nelsoni
 †Pariguana – type locality for genus
 †Pariguana lancensis – type locality for species
 †Parikimys
 †Parikimys carpenteri
 †Parmicorbula
 †Parmicorbula bisulcata
  †Paronychodon
 †Paronychodon lacustris – type locality for species
 †Parvodus
 †Paurodon – type locality for genus
 †Paurodon valens – type locality for species
  †Pecopteris
 †Pecopteris borealis
 †Pecopteris Geyleriana
 Pecten
 †Pecten nebrascensis
  †Pectinodon – type locality for genus
 †Pectinodon bakkeri – type locality for species
 †Pediomys
 †Pediomys elegans – type locality for species
 †Pentacrinus
 †Permophorus
 †Permophorus triassicus – type locality for species
 Persea – report made of unidentified related form or using admittedly obsolete nomenclature
 †Persea hayana
 †Petalolepis – tentative report
 †Petalolepis fibrillatus
 †Phlycticrioceras
 †Phlycticrioceras trinodosus
  †Phoenicites – or unidentified comparable form
  Pholadomya
 †Pholadomya inaequiplicata
 †Pholadomya kingi
 †Phragmites
 †Phragmites falcata
 †Phyllites
 †Phyllites crassipes
 †Phyllites cretaceous
 †Phyllites dentata
 †Phyllites ficifolius
 †Phyllites grandifolius-cretaceous
 Phyllodus
 †Phyllodus toliapicus
   Physa – or unidentified comparable form
 †Piceoerpeton
 †Piceoerpeton naylori
 Pinna
 †Pinna kingi
 Pinus
 †Pinus susquaensis
 Pistacia
 †Pistacia eriensis
  †Pistia
 †Pistia corrugata
  †Placenticeras
 †Placenticeras intercalare
 †Placenticeras meeki
 †Placenticeras pseudoplacenta
 †Plagiostoma
 †Plagiostoma occidentalis
  Planorbis
 †Plastomenus
 †Platacodon – type locality for genus
 †Platacodon nanus – type locality for species
 †Platanites
 †Platanites marginata
 †Platanophyllum
 †Platanophyllum montanum
 †Platanophyllum platanoides
 Platanus
 †Platanus primaeva
  †Platecarpus
 †Platecarpus brachycephalus
 †Platecarpus tympaniticus
 †Platymya
 †Platymya rockymontana
  †Platypterygius
 †Platypterygius americanus – type locality for species
 †Plesiacanthoceras
 †Plesiacanthoceras bellsanum – or unidentified comparable form
 †Plesiacanthoceras wyomingense
 †Plesiobaena
 †Plesiobaena antiqua
  †Plesiopleurodon – type locality for genus
 †Plesiopleurodon wellesi – type locality for species
 †Plesiosaurus
 †Plesiosaurus shirleyensis – type locality for species
 †Pleuromya
 †Pleuromya haydeniana – type locality for species
 †Pleuromya subcompressa
 †Plicatolamna
 †Plicatolamna arcuata
 Plicatula
  Polinices
 †Polinices concinna – or unidentified related form
 †Polyacrodus
 †Polyacrodus parvidens – or unidentified comparable form
  †Polycotylus
  †Poposaurus – type locality for genus
 †Poposaurus gracilis – type locality for species
 Populus
 †Populus aspens
 †Populus aspensis – type locality for species
 †Porosoma
 †Porosoma reesidei – type locality for species
 †Portheus
 †Postligata
 †Postligata crenata
 †Potamoceratodus
 †Potamornis – type locality for genus
 †Potamornis skutchi – type locality for species
 †Powellia – type locality for genus
 †Powellia oblongata – type locality for species
 †Priacodon
 †Priacodon ferox – type locality for species
 †Priacodon grandaevus – type locality for species
 †Priacodon lulli – type locality for species
 †Priacodon robustus – type locality for species
 †Prionocyclus
 †Prionocyclus germari
 †Prionocyclus hyatti
 †Prionocyclus novimexicanus
 †Prodesmodon – type locality for genus
 †Prodesmodon copei – type locality for species
 †Prodiplocynodon – type locality for genus
 †Prodiplocynodon langi – type locality for species
 †Promyalina
 †Promyalina putiatinensis
 †Promyalina spathi
 †Pronoella
 †Pronoella cinnabarensis
 †Pronoella iddingsi – or unidentified comparable form
 †Pronoella uintahensis
 †Prorokia
 †Prorokia fontenellensis
 †Protalphadon
 †Protalphadon lulli – type locality for species
 †Protexanites
 †Protexanites bourgeoisianus
 †Protocardia
 †Protocardia rara
 †Protocardia schucherti – or unidentified comparable form
 †Protophyllocladus
 †Protophyllocladus subintegrifolius
 †Protophyllum
 †Protoplatyrhina
 †Protoplatyrhina renae
  †Protungulatum – tentative report
 Prunus
 †Prunus aspensis – type locality for species
 †Psalodon
 †Psalodon fortis – type locality for species
 †Psalodon marshi – type locality for species
 †Psalodon potens – type locality for species
 †Pseudoctenis
 †Pseudoctenis AF013 – informal
 †Pseudodontaspis – type locality for genus
 †Pseudodontaspis herbsti – type locality for species
 †Pseudoperna
 †Pseudoperna congesta
 †Pteraichnus
 †Pteraichnus stokesi – type locality for species
  †Pteranodon
 †Pteranodon longiceps
  †Pteria
 †Pteria gastrodes
 †Pteria linguaeformis
 †Pteria linguiformis
 †Pteria lingulaeformis
 †Pteria ussurica – or unidentified comparable form
 †Pterodactylus
 †Pterodactylus montanus – type locality for species
 †Ptilotodon
 †Ptilotodon wilsoni
 †Ptychodous
 †Ptychotrygon
 †Ptychotrygon boothi – type locality for species
 †Ptychotrygon ellae – type locality for species
 †Ptychotrygon greybullensis – type locality for species

Q

  †Quenstedtia
 †Quenstedtia sublevis
  †Quenstedtia sublewis
 †Quercophyllum
 †Quercophyllum gardneri
 †Quercophyllum wyomingense – type locality for species
 Quercus
 †Quercus ellisiana
 †Quercus stantoni
 †Quercus stantonii
 †Quercus viburnifolia
 †Quereuxia
 †Quereuxia angulata

R

 †Raninella
 †Reesidella
 †Retinovena – type locality for genus
 †Retinovena fluvialis – type locality for species
 †Retispira
 †Retispira bittneri
 Rhabdocolpus – tentative report
 †Rhaeboceras
 †Rhaeboceras halli
 †Rhaeboceras subglobosum
 †Rhamnus
  †Rhamnus hirsuta
  †Rhamnus minutus
  Rhinobatos
  †Rhinobatos casieri
  †Rhizocorallium
 †Rhynchosauroides – type locality for genus
 †Rhynchosauroides palmatus – type locality for species
  †Richardoestesia
 †Richardoestesia isosceles
 †Ropalonaria
 †Ropalonaria arachne
 Rostellaria – tentative report
 †Rotodactylus – or unidentified comparable form

S

 †Sabalites
 †Sabalites eocenica
 †Sabalites montana
 †Saccoloma – report made of unidentified related form or using admittedly obsolete nomenclature
 †Saccoloma gardneri
 †Saliciphyllum
 †Saliciphyllum wyomingensis
  Salix
 †Salix cumberlandensis
 †Salix frontierensis
 †Salix lancensis
 †Salpichlaena
 †Salpichlaena AF003 – informal
 †Sapindopsis
 †Sapindopsis belviderensis
 †Sapindopsis magnifolia
 †Sapindopsis schultzi – type locality for species
 †Sapindopsis schultzii
 †Sapindopsis variabilis
 †Sarjeantopodus – type locality for genus
 †Sarjeantopodus semipalmatus – type locality for species
  Sassafras
 †Sassafras bradleyi – type locality for species
 †Sassafras bradleyii
 †Sassafras thermale
  †Saurexallopus – type locality for genus
 †Saurexallopus lovei – type locality for species
 †Saurexallopus zerbsti – type locality for species
 †Saurocephalus
  †Saurolophus
  †Sauropelta
 †Sauropelta edwardsorum
  †Sauroposeidon
 †Sauroposeidon proteles
 †Saurornithoides – or unidentified comparable form
  †Saurornitholestes
 †Sauvagesia
 †Sauvagesia austinensis – or unidentified comparable form
  †Scapanorhynchus
 †Scapanorhynchus texanus
 †Scapherpeton
 †Scapherpeton tectum
  †Scaphites
 †Scaphites aquilaensis
 †Scaphites binneyi
 †Scaphites hippocrepis
 †Scaphites stantoni
 †Scaphites ventricosus
 †Scaphites whitfieldi
 †Scleropteris
 †Scleropteris distantifolia – type locality for species
 †Scleropteris rotundifolia – type locality for species
 †Scotiophryne
 †Scotiophryne pustulosa
  Scyliorhinus
 †Scyliorhinus tensleepensis – type locality for species
  †Selaginella
 †Selaginella falcata – tentative report
 †Semiungula – type locality for genus
 †Semiungula assymetrica – type locality for species
  Sequoia
 †Sequoia cuneata
 †Sequoia dakotensis
 †Sequoia gracilia
 †Sequoia gracilis
 †Sequoia langsdorfii
 †Sequoia reichenbachi
 †Sequoia Reichenbachi
 †Serrifusus
 †Serrifusus dakotensis
 †Skolithos
 †Smilax
 †Smilax coloradensis – tentative report
 †Socognathus
 †Socognathus brachyodon – type locality for species
 †Sohlites
 †Sohlites spinosus
 †Sokophyllum – type locality for genus
 †Sokophyllum dentatum – type locality for species
  Solemya
 †Solemya bilix
 †Solemya obscura
 †Solenoceras
 †Solyma
 †Sparganium
 †Sparganium aspens
 †Sparganium aspensis – type locality for species
 Sphaerium – or unidentified comparable form
 †Sphenodiscus
 †Sphenodiscus lobatus – or unidentified comparable form
 †Sphenodiscus pleurisepta
 †Sphenolepidium
 †Sphenolepidium Kurrianum
 †Sphenolepidium parceramosum
 †Sphenopteris
 †Sphenopteris plurinervia
 †Spiroceras
 †Spiroceras orbignyi – or unidentified comparable form
  Squalicorax
 †Squalicorax kaupi
 †Squalicorax pristodontus
 †Squatirhina
 †Squatirhina americana – type locality for species
 †Squatirhina roessingi – type locality for species
 †Staphylea
 †Staphylea fremonti
 †Staphylea fremontii
 †Stegopelta – type locality for genus
 †Stegopelta landerensis – type locality for species
  †Stegosaurus – type locality for genus
 †Stegosaurus affinis – type locality for species
 †Stegosaurus armatus – type locality for species
 †Stegosaurus longispinus – type locality for species
 †Stegosaurus stenops
 †Stegosaurus sulcatus – type locality for species
 †Stegosaurus ungulatus – type locality for species
 †Steinichnus
 †Stemmatoceras
 †Stemmatoceras albertense – or unidentified related form
 Sterculia
 †Sterculia mucronata
 †Sterculia towneri
  †Stokesosaurus – tentative report
 †Stokesosaurus clevelandi
 †Struthiomimus – or unidentified comparable form
  †Stygiochelys
   †Styxosaurus
 †Styxosaurus browni – type locality for species
  †Supersaurus
 †Supersaurus vivianae
 †Syncyclonema
 †Syncyclonema rigida
 †Synechodus
 †Synechodus turneri – type locality for species

T

 †Tancredia
 †Tancredia transversa
  †Tanycolagreus – type locality for genus
 †Tanycolagreus topwilsoni – type locality for species
 Tapeinidium
 Tapeinidium undulatum – tentative report
 †Tarrantoceras
 †Tarrantoceras exile – type locality for species
 †Tarrantoceras flexicostatum – type locality for species
 †Tarrantoceras sellardsi
 †Tatenectes
 †Tatenectes laramiensis – type locality for species
 †Tathiodon – type locality for genus
 †Tathiodon agilis – type locality for species
 †Telacodon
 †Telacodon laevis – type locality for species
 †Tenea
 †Tenea circularis
  †Tenontosaurus
 †Tenontosaurus tilletti
 Teredo
  †Thalassinoides
 †Theatonius – type locality for genus
 †Theatonius lancensis – type locality for species
 †Theretairus – type locality for genus
 †Theretairus antiquus – type locality for species
  †Thescelosaurus – type locality for genus
 †Thescelosaurus neglectus – type locality for species
 †Thescelus
 †Thescelus insiliens – type locality for species
  †Thoracosaurus – or unidentified comparable form
 Thracia
 †Thracia weedi
 Thyasira
  †Thyrsopteris
 †Thyrsopteris brevifolia
 †Thyrsopteris brevipennis
 †Thyrsopteris crassinervis
 †Thyrsopteris dentifolia – type locality for species
 †Thyrsopteris elliptica
 †Thyrsopteris pecopteroides
 †Thyrsopteris pinnatifida
 †Tinodon – type locality for genus
 †Tinodon bellus – type locality for species
  †Torosaurus – type locality for genus
 †Torosaurus latus – type locality for species
 †Torotix – type locality for genus
 †Torotix clemensi – type locality for species
  †Torvosaurus – type locality for genus
 †Torvosaurus tanneri – type locality for species
 †Trachodon
 †Trachyscaphites
 †Trachyscaphites redbirdensis
 †Trachytriton
 †Trachytriton vinculum
 †Tragodesmoceras
 †Tragodesmoceras carlilense
 †Trapa
 †Trapa microphylla
  †Triceratops – type locality for genus
 †Triceratops horridus – type locality for species
 †Triceratops ingens – type locality for species
 †Triceratops prorsus – type locality for species
 †Triceratops sulcatus – type locality for species
  †Trigonia
 †Trigonia americana
 †Trigonia elegantissima
 †Trigonia montanaensis
 †Trigonia quadrangularis
 †Trioracodon
 †Trioracodon bisulcus – type locality for species
  Trochocyathus – tentative report
 †Trochodendroides
   †Troodon
 †Troodon formosus
 †Turgidodon
 †Turgidodon rhaister – type locality for species
 †Turgidodon russelli
 Typha
 †Tyrannosaurus – type locality for genus
 †Tyrannosaurus rex – type locality for species

U

 †Ulmiphyllum
 †Ulmiphyllum densinerve – type locality for species
 †Uluops – type locality for genus
 †Uluops uluops – type locality for species
 Unio
 †Unionites
 †Unionites fassaensis

V

 Vanikoro
 †Vanikoro ambigua
 †Vanikoropsis
 †Vanikoropsis nebrascensis
 †Vaugonia
  †Vaugonia conradi
 †Veniella
 †Veniella mortoni
  †Viburnum
 †Viburnum marginatum
 †Viburnum montanum
 †Viburnum rotundifolium
 Vitis
 †"Vitis" stantoni
  Viviparus – or unidentified comparable form
 †Volutoderma

W

 †Weediaphyllum – type locality for genus
 †Weediaphyllum parkensis – type locality for species
  †Weichselia
 †Weichselia reticulata
 †Williamsonia – tentative report
 †Williamsonia phoenicopsoides – type locality for species
 †Woodwardia
 †Woodwardia crenata

X

 †Xenocephalites
 †Xenoxylon
  †Xiphactinus
 †Xiphactinus vetus

Y

 Yoldia
 †Yoldia scitula – or unidentified related form
 †Yoldia ventricosa

Z

  †Zamites
 †Zamites arcticus
 †Zamites borealis
 †Zamites brevipennis
 †Zapsalis – or unidentified comparable form
 †Zephyrosaurus – or unidentified comparable form
 †Zofiabaatar – type locality for genus
 †Zofiabaatar pulcher – type locality for species

References

External links
 

Wyoming
Mesozoic